Ram Labhaya Lakhina (born 1 February 1939, Lahore, British India) is an Indian entrepreneur and community leader living in Oegstgeest, Netherlands. He was the first Chairman of the Global Organization of People of Indian Origin (GOPIO). He is the Founder, former Chairman and now Chairman Emeritus of the Netherlands India Chamber of Commerce and Trade (NICCT), serves as a Chairman of the Mahatma Gandhi Memorial Foundation, and is one of the founders of The World Forum for Ethics and Business.

In January 2009 he became the recipient of the Pravasi Bharatiya Samman award conferred on him by the President of India Pratibha Patil in acknowledgement of his contribution in the field of community service.

In September 2009 his investiture was as an honorary Knight of the Order of Orange-Nassau, by Queen Beatrix of the Netherlands, for his merits to society in the field of cultural and economic relations between India and the Netherlands.

Biography
Ram Lakhina was born in Lahore, then British India, on 1 February 1939. After the partition of India, he moved to Delhi. He completed his school and college education in Delhi with distinction, graduating with B.A. (Hons) from Delhi University in 1959. Lakhina received a merit scholarship from Delhi School of Economics and did his M.A. first year. He then went on a scholarship programme to the US for higher studies and graduated with a degree in M.A. Economics from the University of Minnesota in 1963.

While attending Delhi University, Ram was elected Chairman of his College Union. He was also elected President of Delhi University Students Union and Secretary General of the National Council of University Students of India.

He was also the Editor of the University Mirror, Delhi University from 1958 to 1959. He co-edited a publication called Fifty Years of Indo-Dutch Cooperation in 1999.

Career
During 1961–1968, Lakhina served in various positions at the International Student Conference, including the post of Secretary General in 1966–1968.

Ram Lakhina founded the Indo-Dutch Chamber of Commerce to promote business relations between India and the Netherlands. He was President of the Chamber from 1979 to 2003.

In 1980, Ram Lakhina co-founded the Foundation for Critical Choices for India (FCCI) and served as its president from 1983 to 1991 and then again from 1994 to 2003.

He has also served as a member on the high level committee of Non-Resident Indians appointed by the Ministry of Commerce, Government of India to promote India's foreign trade from 1988 to 1991.

From 1994 to 2002, Lakhina was the first Chairman of the Global Organization for People of Indian Origin (GOPIO), a non-partisan, secular global organisation engaged in promoting the wellbeing of people of Indian origin.

Since 1999, Lakhina is the Chairman of Mahatma Gandhi Memorial Foundation (Stichting Standbeeld Mahatma Gandhi), Amsterdam.

Another organisation, with which Lakhina has been closely associated for a long period, is the Netherlands India Chamber of Commerce and Trade (NICCT) which came into being as a result of the merger between the India Trade Council and the Indo Dutch Chamber of Commerce and Trade. Lakhina is the Founder and has been the Executive President since its establishment in 2003 up to April 2010. He then served as the Chairman until 2015. He is now the Chairman Emeritus.

Recently, Lakhina co-founded is The World Forum for Ethics and Business, a Belgium-based foundation which mandate includes all manners of pursuing and establishing the indispensable ethical foundations of business in a globalised world.

Personal life
Lakhina married Sanyukta Kashyap in 1966. They have two children – daughter Kavita (1972), who works in the family business; and son Lavesh (1975), who manages his own company and is the Founder and Executive President of the Indian Expat Society.

Recognitions
 2009: Knight of the Order of Orange-Nassau (24 September 2009)
 2008: Pravasi Bharatiya Community Service Award

Award

References

Sources
 100 Global Indians – The Indian, Sital K Motwani
 Fifty Years of Indo-Dutch Cooperation – Foundation for Critical Choices of India, 1999
 Indian Diaspora in the Netherlands
 FCCI List of Trustees
 Connecting India Article
  The Founders of the World Forum for Ethics in Business

External links
FCCI
GOPIO
NICCT
The World Forum for Ethics and Business
Pravasi Bharatiya Divas
 Stichting Standbeeld Mahatma Gandhi

Businesspeople of Indian descent
Living people
1939 births
University of Minnesota College of Liberal Arts alumni
Punjabi people
People from Oegstgeest
Knights of the Order of Orange-Nassau
Presidents of Delhi University Students Union
Delhi University alumni
Indian emigrants to the Netherlands
Recipients of Pravasi Bharatiya Samman